Network 23 may refer to:

Network 23 (record label), a defunct Czech record label
Network 23 (company), a defunct British video game development company
Network 23, a fictional television network on the TV series Max Headroom
"Network 23", a song by Tangerine Dream from their album Exit